The Trichosomoididae is a family of nematodes.

Morphological characteristics 
The Trichosomoididae, as most nematodes, have an elongate body, vermiform and covered with a cuticle. There is often a cuticular ornamentation in form of cephalic vesicles or bosses. They are 'aphasmidian' nematodes, i.e. they have no phasmids. 
The Trichosomoididae are small, with sometimes a marked sexual dimorphism, the female being larger than the male. In some cases, the male lives permanently or penetrates deeply in the female uterus. The body is slightly thicker in the posterior end. 
The anterior part of the oesophagus is short, its posterior part is surrounded by glandular cells called stichocytes, arranged in chain. 
The spicule and spicular sheath are absent or vestigial in the male. 
The female has its vulva near the end of the oesophagus and its anus is terminal. Females are oviparous; eggs are thick-shelled, with plugs on both poles. Eggs are embryonated when laid or laid at very early stage with incompletely developed shells.

Biology 

Nematodes of the family Trichosomoididae are all parasites of various tissues (mucosa, paracloacal glands, cornea, musculature, swimbladder wall) and even bones of fishes and mammals.

Classification 
According to Moravec(2001)

, the family Trichosomoididae Hall, 1916 

includes
 Subfamily Anatrichosomatinae Smith & Chitwood, 1954
 Genus Anatrichosoma Smith & Chitwood, 1954
 Subfamily Huffmanelinae Moravec, 2001 (Tissue parasites of fishes)
 Genus Huffmanela Moravec, 1987
 Subfamily Trichosomoidinae Hall, 1916
 Genus Trichosomoides Railliet, 1895
 Genus Trichuroides Ricci, 1949

References

External links 

Trichocephalida